Byemoor is a hamlet in Alberta, Canada within the County of Stettler No. 6.

The hamlet is located in Census Division No. 7 and in the federal riding of Crowfoot.

History 
Byemoor was built in the early twentieth century along the railroad line, and was so named for the area's resemblance to a moor in England (Byemoor  name originates from "By-the-moor")  In its early years, it was an important centre as it was the main town for a large number of small farms. Crises in agriculture and improvement of transportation to larger centres, however, led to the slow depopulation of the hamlet and area.

Demographics 

Services and infrastructure 
Byemoor is home to a small hotel, arena, community hall, curling rink, St. Paul's Anglican Church and Byemoor School (elementary/junior high school) all of which service the small farming community, as well as some minor oil field offices.

See also 
List of communities in Alberta
List of designated places in Alberta
List of hamlets in Alberta

References

External links 
St.Paul's Anglican Church, Byemoor
Byemoor School
Byemoor - Endiang History

Hamlets in Alberta
Designated places in Alberta
County of Stettler No. 6